Bunton may refer to:
 Cleaver Bunton, a mayor of Albury, New South Wales, Australia
 Emma Bunton, an English pop singer and songwriter
 Haydn Bunton, Jr., a player and coach of Australian rules football
 Haydn Bunton, Sr., an Australian rules football player
 Jacob Bunton, an American musician (Lynam, Mars Electric, Adler)
 Kempton Bunton, who stole a painting from the National Gallery, London
 Lorraine Bunton, All-American Girls Professional Baseball League player